The German Conservative Party (DKP) was a right-wing political party of the German Empire founded in 1876. It largely represented the wealthy landowning elite Prussian Junkers.

The party was a response to German unification, universal and equal franchise in national elections and rapid industrialization. It changed from a diffuse party of broad ideology into an interest party in Bismarckian Germany. In the early 1870s, Otto von Bismarck formed his majority with the base in the National Liberal Party which emphasized free trade and anti-Catholicism. Bismarck broke with them in the late 1870s, by which time the German Conservative Party and the Free Conservative Party had brought together the landed Junkers in the East and the rapidly growing industrial leadership in the major cities. They now became the main base of Bismarck's support and successive Chancellors down to 1918.

According to Robert M. Berdahl, this redirection illustrated "the slow and painful process by which the landed aristocracy adjusted to its new position in the capitalist 'class' system that had come to replace the precapitalist 'Estate' structure of Prussian society".

Policies 
The German Conservative Party was generally seen as representing the interests of the German nobility, the Junker landowners living east of the Elbe and the Evangelical Church of the Prussian Union and had its political stronghold in the Prussian Diet, where the three-class franchise gave rural elites disproportionate power. Predominantly Prussian traditionalists, the party members had been skeptical at first about the 1871 unification of Germany—unlike the Free Conservative Party, a national conservative split-off dominated by business magnates unrestrictedly supporting the policies of Chancellor Otto von Bismarck.

The policies of Old Conservatives like Field Marshal Helmuth von Moltke or Elard von Oldenburg-Januschau generally embraced support for the powers of the monarchy and opposition to economic liberalism and democratization, the introduction of electoral reform in Prussia, or true parliamentary government in Germany as a whole. Due to universal suffrage, on federal level the DKP had to face strikingly decreased significance. In the 1878 federal election, it gained 13.0% of the votes cast and entered the Reichstag parliament with 59 deputies. Afterwards, the party, which furthermore lost votes as Germans moved from rural areas to new industrial centers in the west (Ostflucht), forged an electoral alliance with the Christian Social Party under Adolf Stoecker, opportunistically embracing antisemitism. The 1892 party program denounced a "demoralizing Jewish influence", but when this attitude failed to halt the party's fall in the polls this element was de-emphasized. Stoecker finally revoked the alliance in 1896.

Though predominantly Protestant, the DKP opposed the Kulturkampf, but supported Bismarck when during the Long Depression he began to implement protectionist policies by restricting grain imports from Russia and the United States. Following this, the DKP strongly opposed the New Course of his successor Leo von Caprivi and it also withdrew its confidence in Chancellor Bernhard von Bülow, when he tried to implement an inheritance tax reform and finally had to resign in 1909 after The Daily Telegraph Affair. The party supported Kaiser Wilhelm II's naval policies and Germany's arms race with the United Kingdom, but initially kept its distance towards colonialism and the activists of the Pan-German League.

The party was dissolved following the fall of the monarchy in November 1918 and the German Revolution. Most of its supporters turned to the newly established German National People's Party. The Deutschkonservative Partei had no direct connection to the Deutsche Rechtspartei founded in 1946, which used the name Deutsche Konservative Partei (German Conservative Party) in parts of West Germany.

See also 

 Conservatism in Germany

Notes

Further reading 
 Berdahl, Robert M. "Conservative Politics and aristocratic landholders in Bismarckian Germany." Journal of Modern History 44#1 (1972): 2–20. in JSTOR.
 Retallack, James N. "Conservatives" contra" Chancellor: Official Responses to the Spectre of Conservative Demagoguery from Bismarck to Bülow." Canadian Journal of History/Annales Canadiennes d'Histoire 20#2 (1985) pp 203–236.
 Retallack, James. "'What Is to Be Done?' The Red Specter, Franchise Questions, and the Crisis of Conservative Hegemony in Saxony, 1896–1909." Central European History 23#4 (1990): 271–312. online.
 Retallack, James. Notables of the Right: The Conservative Party and Political Mobilization in Germany, 1876-1918 (1988).
 Retallack, James. The German Right, 1860-1920: Political Limits of the Authoritarian Imagination  (2006).
 Retallack, James. Germany's Second Reich: Portraits and Pathways (2015).

External links 
 Konservatives Handbuch (The Conservative Handbook). Published by the party in 1898.
 Webpage from the German Historical Museum (in German).

Defunct political parties in Germany
Political parties established in 1876
Christian political parties in Germany
Conservative parties in Germany
German nationalist political parties
Political parties of the German Empire
Protestant political parties
1876 establishments in Germany
Monarchist parties in Germany
Right-wing parties in Europe
National conservative parties
Social conservative parties
Political parties disestablished in 1918
1918 disestablishments in Germany